The Adelaide Football Club, often referred to as the Old Adelaide Football Club, was an Australian rules football club based in Adelaide. Founded on 26 April 1860, it was the first football club formed in South Australia.

The club played interclub football in South Australia until 1872, when it had disputes with Kensington and Port Adelaide over the rules, but club resumed interclub matches in 1875.

In 1876, the Adelaide Club rules were adopted by all the South Australian clubs at a meeting organised by Charles Kingston from the South Adelaide Football Club, and in 1877, the Adelaide club captain Richard Twopeny called an initial meeting which led to the formation of the South Australian Football Association (SAFA) and participated in the competition from 1877–81 and 1885–93.

The club won successive premierships in interclub competition in 1871-72, and also won the 1886 SAFA premiership. The club dropped out of the SAFA and folded at the end of the 1893 season.

The Old Adelaide Football Club has no relation to the current Adelaide Football Club currently playing in the Australian Football League (AFL) and the South Australian National Football League (SANFL).

History

Background

In 1854 Adelaide businessman John Acraman imported five round footballs from England and paid for the construction of goal posts at St Peter's College in Adelaide's eastern suburbs. St Peter's football matches were played between Frome Road and Adelaide Bridge, on a similar site to the current University Oval. In the following years the interest in football in South Australia began to grow with reports of matches being played across the state becoming more common.

Formation at Globe Inn Hotel 
 
On 25 April 1860 an advertisement in the South Australian Register appeared notifying the Adelaide public about an upcoming meeting the following day to form a football club. The advertisement, sponsored by John Acraman, W.J. Fullarton and R. Cussen noted that group had already gathered 30 members.

On Thursday 26 April 1860 the Adelaide Football Club was formed at the Globe Inn Hotel, Rundle Street with John Brodie Spence chairing the meeting. It was thereby the first football club established in South Australia.

Early intra-club years (1860–1861)

1860 

The club played its first intra-club match on the North Park Lands of Adelaide on 28 April 1860. The captains for this match were J.B. Spence and John Acraman. This first game lasted nearly 3 hours.

The club initially only played internal matches between players located North and South of the River Torrens.

The fourth meeting took place on the South Park Lands on 19 May 1860 with coloured uniforms adopted. The team from players North of the River Torrens wore blue caps and the side south wore pink caps. For this match the captains were Thomas O'Halloran and R. Cussen.

By mid June 1860 the club had already grown to over 100 members, including four members of the South Australian parliament.

The final game for 1860 attracted 200 spectators. John Acraman was again captain of one side and Thomas O'Halloran the other. North Adelaide would win by one goal.

1861 
The clubs first annual general meeting since the clubs formation was, again, held at the Globe Inn Hotel on 10 April 1861. At this meeting James MacGeorge was elected as club chairman.

The first intra-club match for the club in 1861, delayed by a week, occurred on 27 April. Thomas O'Halloran and John Acraman were chosen as captains for this match.Thomas O'Halloran's side wore blue and John Acraman's side wore pink. Thomas O'Halloran's side won 2–0.

The club scheduled a training session on the North Park Lands for 11 May. However due to rain they cancelled.

The second intra-club match for the club in 1861, played on the North Park Lands as usual, was advertised for 18 May as pitting the "Past and Present Collegians" in blue against "The other Members of the Club" in pink. However, the post game report described an inter-club match featuring the Adelaide Football Club playing against "the College boys". Present at this match were, amongst others, Richard Graves MacDonnell (Governor of South Australia), Augustus Short (Lord Bishop of Adelaide), James Farrell (Anglican Dean of Adelaide), James Hurtle Fisher (President of the South Australian Legislative Council), John Morphett (Chief Secretary of South Australia), Henry Ayers (South Australian Legislative Council). For this match Mr. Cooper was selected as captain of the pink team and Thomas O'Halloran captain of the blue team. Each team had 25 players and the game resulted in a 0–0 draw.

The third intra-club match for the club in 1861 was scheduled to take place on 1 June on the North Park Lands. However due to a rowing event in Port Adelaide and a college archery practice, the match was postponed. The third intra-club match for the club in 1861 eventually took place on 10 August between a College side, captained by Thomas O'Halloran, and a non-College side, captained by Mr Cooper. The College side won 2–0. During this match a horse ran through the field of play.

Early years of inter-club football (1862–1872)

1862 
The first recorded match against a rival club was played in 1862 against the Modbury and Teatree Gully Football Club on a strip of grass near the Modbury Hotel. Adelaide won the game two goals to nil. The two teams met again the next year, and "the game was kept up with the greatest spirit and good feeling, and so equally were the sides matched that not a goal was obtained".

In another internal game held on 14 June 1862 after some postponement, the Pink team comprised St Peter's Collegians, Thomas O'Halloran, and the remainder were Blues, captained by C. D. Cooper.

1863 
During the final stages of the last match of the 1863 season between Adelaide and the Modbury and Teatree Gully Football Club some Indigenous Australians were allowed to participate for both sides. The newspaper described the indigenous players by saying their "manoeuvres were ludicrous in the extreme".

1864 
In 1864 the club produced printed copies of their rules to avoid disputes. The club hosted a 'Town and Country' match in 1864.

1867 
On 31 August 1867 the club played a match against a team from the 50th Regiment on the North Park Lands. The Adelaide club won 3–0.

1868 
A match was played on 13 June 1868 between Adelaide and a local Collegian side with the latter winning.

1870 
In 1870 the club lost many of its best players to the newly formed city club Young Australians.

Exile over the games rules (1873–1874) 
By 1873, the Kensington club rules became popular amongst the other clubs, along with attempts at standardisation. After Adelaide's attempts to retain their rules were rebuffed by Kensington and Port Adelaide, they went into recess until 1875.

Return to the fold (1875) 
After the clubs exile from inter club football in 1873 and 1874, the club had suffered significantly, and was no longer the premier football club. Adelaide had one win and a draw from its five its inter club fixtures for the season, finishing last. It was from this point in time that the club began to commonly be referred to as the Old Adelaide Football Club.

The 20 July meeting (1876) 
On 20 July 1876, Charles Kingston from the South Adelaide Football Club organised a meeting at the old Prince Alfred Hotel and pleaded with the delegates of the other local clubs that the rules of the Old Adelaide club be universally adopted by South Australian clubs as they closely resembled those used in Melbourne. Part of Charles Kingston's argument to adopt the Old Adelaide club rules over the Kensington club rules was that by having rules similar to those being used in Melbourne, intercolonial football matches could be held in the future. By the end of the meeting Charles Kingston had his way and the old Adelaide club rules were adopted by all the clubs. The Adelaide Club - the mother of South Australia football which was dissolved on the adoption of the Kensington rules was reconstructed by Mr. H. Conigrave and other gentlemen in August, 1876.

SAFA foundation club (1877) 
In April 1877 Adelaide captain Nowell Twopenney was influential in calling for the establishment of the South Australian Football Association (SAFA). The club subsequently became one of the founding members of the SAFA (later renamed as the SANFL). In the SAFA's inaugural season, Adelaide finished third, winning 11 matches (one win by forfeit), losing three and drawing three, scoring a total of 31 goals and finishing with a positive goal differential of 18.

Adelaide finished fifth out of seven teams in each of the next two seasons, and last in 1880.

Merger with Kensington and temporary dissolution (1881–1884) 
The team's poor performances on and off-field forced the club to merge with Kensington Football Club for the 1881 SAFA season due to a lack of players. These problems continued, forcing the combined team to resign from the SAFA competition on 1 June 1881 after playing four matches, with a fifth being forfeited when the team failed to appear. During the years 1882 to 1884, the club did not play in the SAFA.

SAFA re-entry, Premiers, wins over Carlton and British Lions, Defections and Merger (1885–1889)

Following a well attended meeting at the Prince Albert Hotel on Thursday 5 March 1885 it was resolved the combined football clubs Adelaide and North Parks would enter two teams - senior portion as Adelaide in the SAFA and the junior as North Parks in Adelaide and Suburban Football Association (ASFA) for the 1885 Seasons.

An internal match of the two clubs was played on Saturday 11 April 1885 at the old North Parks oval. Sides were chosen by Adelaide Club captain J. D. Stephens and vice-captain G. M. Evan, and the ball was started by the president of the club, Mr. L. P. Lawrence.

The new team finished last out of four teams in 1885, but surprised much of the competition to claim the SAFA premiership in 1886 under the captaincy of J. D. Stephens.

Adelaide was involved in an experimental night game played under electric lights at Adelaide Oval on 1 July 1885. It beat South Adelaide 1 goal 8 behinds to 8 behinds.

Adelaide finished third out of seven teams in each of the next three seasons, also playing matches against the visiting Victorian Football Association (VFA) premiers  in 1887, winning nine goals to three, and against a visiting British team in 1888, winning six goals to three.

After the triumphs of 1886 and 1887, very poor management led to the defection of many of the key members of the 1886 premiership team.

In March 1889 (just prior to the season starting) Adelaide merged with North Adelaide, the former Hotham and no relation to the current SANFL North Adelaide team, after North Adelaide Football Club (1881–1888) had spent two seasons (1887-1888) in the S.A.F.A. The club retained the red and black as its colours. During the 1889 Season the Club went on a tour of Victoria and played games against N.Melbourne, South Ballarat, Maryborough and the Sandhurst Association.

Rapid decline and final dissolution (1890–1893) 
By the 1890s, the club was the chopping block of the SAFA, and struggled to field a team.

1890 
Adelaide recruited key forward Alexander McKenzie from Port Adelaide.

1891 
Alexander McKenzie returning to Port Adelaide after the 1890 season.

1892

1893

Adelaide would win three successive wooden spoons from 1891-1893 (with records of 0-16, 0-15-1 and 1-15 in those seasons), and also having a winless streak of 40 matches between 1890-1893.

With these on-field performances and the club being insolvent, Adelaide dropped out of the SAFA and folded at the end of the 1893 season.

Honour board

Notes and references

Former South Australian National Football League clubs
Australian rules football clubs in South Australia
Australian rules football clubs established in 1860
Australian rules football clubs disestablished in 1893
1860 establishments in Australia
1893 disestablishments in Australia